The 22943/22944 Indore–Daund Superfast Express is a superfast train of the Indian Railways which runs between  in Madhya Pradesh and  in Maharashtra. Recently its rakes are being converted to LHB to give more comfort to passengers.

It is the first rail connection between Indore and Daund other being Indore–Pune Express (via Panvel).

Coach composition

The train consists of 22 coaches:

 1 AC II Tier
 4 AC III Tier
 11 Sleeper class
 4 General Unreserved
 2 Seating cum Luggage Rake

Service

22943/Daund–Indore Superfast Express has an average speed of 57 km/hr and covers 962 km in 17 hrs 00 mins.
22944/Indore–Daund Superfast Express has an average speed of 55 km/hr and covers 962 km in 17 hrs 30 mins.

Route and halts 

The important halts of the train are:

Schedule

Rake sharing

The train shares its rake with 19311/19312 Indore–Pune Express (via Panvel).

Traction

Both trains are hauled by a Vadodara Electric Loco Shed-based WAP-4E or WAP-5 or WAP-7 electric locomotive.

See also

 Avantika Express
 Indore–Pune Express (via Panvel)

References

External links 

 22943/Pune–Indore Superfast Express India Rail Info
 22944/Indore–Pune Superfast Express India Rail Info

Transport in Indore
Transport in Pune
Express trains in India
Railway services introduced in 1999
Rail transport in Madhya Pradesh
Rail transport in Maharashtra
Rail transport in Gujarat
1999 establishments in India